Chester is an unincorporated community and census-designated place (CDP) in Lake County, South Dakota, United States. The population was 257 as of the 2020 census. Chester has been assigned the ZIP code of 57016.

History
Chester was laid out in 1905, and named after Chester Township.

Geography
Skunk Creek, the outlet of Brant Lake, forms the western edge of the community and flows south to the Big Sioux River at Sioux Falls.

Demographics

References

External links
 Chester Area Schools

Census-designated places in Lake  County, South Dakota
Census-designated places in South Dakota
Unincorporated communities in Lake County, South Dakota
Unincorporated communities in South Dakota